Zimbabwe competed at the 1988 Summer Olympics in Seoul, South Korea. 29 competitors, 23 men and 6 women, took part in 38 events in 10 sports.

Competitors
The following is the list of number of competitors in the Games.

Archery

After not competing in the 1984 archery competition, Zimbabwe returned in 1988.

Women's Individual Competition:
 Merrellyn Tarr — Preliminary Round (→ 62nd place)

Men's Individual Competition:
 Paul Bamber — Preliminary Round (→ 60th place) 
 Alan Bryant — Preliminary Round (→ 72nd place) 
 Wrex Tarr — Preliminary Round (→ 78th place)

Men's Team Competition:
 Bamber, Bryant, and Tarr — Preliminary Round (→ 21st place)

Athletics

Men's 400 metres
 Elijah Nkala
 Heat — 46.60 (→ did not advance)

Men's 10.000 metres
 Stanley Mandebele
 Heat — 29:50.99 (→ did not advance)

Men's Marathon 
 James Gombedza — 2"38.13 (→ 72nd place)

Women's Marathon 
 Linda Hunter — 2"53.17 (→ 55th place)

Boxing

Cycling

Two male cyclists represented Zimbabwe in 1988.

Men's road race
 Pierre Gouws
 Gary Mandy

Men's 1 km time trial
 Gary Mandy

Diving

Women's 3m Springboard
 Tracy Cox-Smyth reached Finals, came 12th.

Judo

Sailing

Shooting

Swimming

Men's 50m Freestyle
 Vaughan Smith
 Heat — 25.29 (→ did not advance, 52nd place)

 Graham Thompson
 Heat — 25.38 (→ did not advance, 53rd place)

Men's 100m Freestyle
 Vaughan Smith
 Heat — 53.58 (→ did not advance, 46th place)

 Graham Thompson
 Heat — 55.20 (→ did not advance, 60th place)

Men's 200m Freestyle
 Vaughan Smith
 Heat — 1:56.13 (→ did not advance, 42nd place)

Men's 100m Backstroke
 Brett Halford
 Heat — 1:02.95 (→ did not advance, 44th place)

Men's 200m Backstroke
 Brett Halford
 Heat — 2:17.84 (→ did not advance, 37th place)

Men's 100m Butterfly
 Graham Thompson
 Heat — 1:00.13 (→ did not advance, 43rd place)

Men's 200m Individual Medley
 Graham Thompson
 Heat — 2:17.06 (→ did not advance, 47th place)

 Vaughan Smith
 Heat — 2:18.07 (→ did not advance, 50th place)

Women's 50m Freestyle
 Catherine Fogarty
 Heat — 28.66 (→ did not advance, 40th place)

Women's 100m Freestyle
 Catherine Fogarty
 Heat — 1:02.47 (→ did not advance, 49th place)

Women's 200m Freestyle
 Catherine Fogarty
 Heat — 2:13.44 (→ did not advance, 41st place)

Tennis

Men's Doubles Competition
 Mark Gurr and Philip Tuckniss
 First Round – Defeated Victor Caballero and Hugo Chapacu (Paraguay) 4-6 6-3 6-3 6-1
 Second Round – Lost to Stefan Edberg and Anders Järryd (Sweden) 0-6 1-6 4-6

References

External links
Official Olympic Reports

Nations at the 1988 Summer Olympics
1988
O